= Slava Klavora Theatre =

Theater

The Slava Klavora Theatre was a theatre group active in Maribor, Slovenia. It was founded by the teacher and actor Janez Karlin (1922–). It was named after Communist Party member Slava Klavora (1921–1941). The theatre is best known as the oldest amateur theatre in Slovenia.
